James Collins (born 8 February 1986 in Birmingham) is an English rugby union player. He currently plays as a flanker for Worcester Warriors in the Guinness Premiership.

Collins is part of a crop of rising stars at Sixways eager to stake a first team claim.

As a product of the Academy system, back row Collins started the EDF Energy Cup victory over Northampton Saints at Franklin's Gardens in September 2006 and European Challenge Cup game with Clermont in October 2006. He has also made a number of impressive Guinness 'A' league appearances.

In January 2008, Collins was selected to play for the England Sevens team for their IRB Sevens World Series games, making his debut at the 2008 Wellington Sevens.

In March 2009 Collins signed a new deal keeping him at Sixways until the end of the 2011 RFU Championship Season, but in March 2011, it was announced that James had been released by the club and that he had signed a new two-year deal with the Sale Sharks Rugby Club.

References

External links
Worcester Warriors Profile  at Warriors.co.uk
Guinness Premiership Profile at GuinnessPremiership.com
England profile

1986 births
Living people
English rugby union players
Rugby union players from Birmingham, West Midlands
Worcester Warriors players
Rugby union flankers
People educated at Old Swinford Hospital